Igor Ivanovich Dobrovolski (Ihor Ivanovych Dobrovolskyi; born 27 August 1967) is a football manager and a former player. He is the head coach of FC Dinamo-Auto Tiraspol.

He started his career in the Moldavian SSR, then played in the Russian SFSR, Spain, Switzerland, Italy, France and Germany before retiring in Moldova. He never played in the Ukrainian SSR or independent Ukraine.

Club career
Born in Markivka, Rozdilna Raion, Odessa Oblast, Ukrainian SSR, Dobrovolski trained at Tiraspol Children and Youth Sport School N4 in Moldavian SSR in early years (now in Transnistria). During his extensive career he played for Nistru Chişinău, Dynamo Moscow, Castellón, Servette, Genoa, Olympique de Marseille, Atlético Madrid, Fortuna Düsseldorf and Tiligul Tiraspol.

International career
Dobrovolski played for three different national teams: USSR at the 1988 Olympic Games where he was a gold medal winner and finished second top goal scorer with six goals (including one in the gold medal game itself); Romário scored seven but Brazil lost in the final to USSR. He was also part, with the same team, of the 1990 FIFA World Cup, representing afterwards the CIS at UEFA Euro 1992 and Russia at Euro 1996. He scored CIS's only goal in UEFA Euro 1992, in a 1–1 draw against Germany.

Four players have had the honour of scoring at least one goal in five successive matches at the Men's Olympic Football Tournament – Igor Dobrovolski (USSR in 1988), Ottmar Hitzfeld (FR Germany in 1972), Milan Galić (Yugoslavia in 1960) and Adolfo Baloncieri (Italy in 1928). Only Dobrovolski and Galić actually claimed gold.

Honours 
 Gold Medal at the 1988 Olympics
 Silver Boot at the 1988 Olympics (6 goals)
 Soviet Footballer of the Year: 1990
 1990 UEFA European Under-21 Championship Winner
 Ligue 1: 1992–93
 UEFA Champions League: 1992–93 Winner

Coaching career
At 39 years old he was coaching Tiligul Tiraspol in the 2005–06 season, and then took over the Moldova national football team for the qualification to UEFA Euro 2008, with a view to a two-year extension to his contract if he was successful.

In December 2007, he signed a new contract with Moldova. He was allowed to coach any club until the start of 2010 FIFA World Cup qualification (UEFA). On 16 October 2009, Dobrovolski announced his resignation.

Managerial statistics

References

1967 births
Living people
People from Odesa Oblast
Dual internationalists (football)
Ukrainian emigrants to Russia
Soviet footballers
Soviet Union international footballers
Soviet Union under-21 international footballers
Soviet expatriate footballers
Russian footballers
Russian football managers
Russia international footballers
Russian expatriate footballers
Expatriate footballers in Italy
Expatriate footballers in Spain
Expatriate footballers in Switzerland
Expatriate footballers in France
Expatriate footballers in Germany
Expatriate footballers in Moldova
Association football forwards
FC Dynamo Moscow players
Dynamo sports society athletes
Servette FC players
Olympique de Marseille players
Genoa C.F.C. players
La Liga players
CD Castellón footballers
Atlético Madrid footballers
Fortuna Düsseldorf players
Soviet Top League players
Serie A players
Bundesliga players
2. Bundesliga players
Ligue 1 players
Russian Premier League players
Olympic footballers of the Soviet Union
Olympic gold medalists for the Soviet Union
Footballers at the 1988 Summer Olympics
1990 FIFA World Cup players
UEFA Euro 1992 players
UEFA Euro 1996 players
Expatriate football managers in Moldova
Moldova national football team managers
FC Dacia Chișinău managers
FC Dinamo-Auto Tiraspol managers
Olympic medalists in football
Medalists at the 1988 Summer Olympics
Russian expatriate sportspeople in France
Russian expatriate sportspeople in Germany
Russian expatriate sportspeople in Spain
Russian expatriate sportspeople in Switzerland
Russian expatriate sportspeople in Italy
UEFA Champions League winning players
Moldovan Super Liga players
Moldovan Super Liga managers
Russian expatriate football managers